The South Wairarapa District is a district at the south-east tip of the North Island of New Zealand, governed by the South Wairarapa District Council. The district comprises the southernmost part of the Wairarapa, and is part of the Wellington Region.

Features
The district comprises the floodplain of the Ruamahanga River and the associated Lake Wairarapa, as well as the long southern stretch of Palliser Bay. To the west of the plains rise the eastern slopes of the Remutaka Range, the crest of which forms the western boundary of the district, while the Aorangi Range lies to the southeast. The southernmost point of the North Island, Cape Palliser, is in the South Wairarapa.

While it is predominantly rural, the South Wairarapa has three towns. The two largest towns, almost identical in population, are Greytown and Featherston. Greytown is where Arbor Day was first celebrated in New Zealand. The Fell Locomotive Museum in Featherston has a museum displaying the world's only Fell locomotive. The third largest town and the seat of the district council is Martinborough; it is the centre of a nationally important wine-producing area. 

It is expected that the number of people living in the district's urban areas will increase due to rising property prices in Wellington proper, and the proximity to transport links.

Demographics

South Wairarapa District had a population of 10,575 at the 2018 New Zealand census, an increase of 1,047 people (11.0%) since the 2013 census, and an increase of 1,683 people (18.9%) since the 2006 census. There were 4,335 households. There were 5,271 males and 5,307 females, giving a sex ratio of 0.99 males per female. The median age was 47.1 years (compared with 37.4 years nationally), with 1,917 people (18.1%) aged under 15 years, 1,314 (12.4%) aged 15 to 29, 5,025 (47.5%) aged 30 to 64, and 2,319 (21.9%) aged 65 or older.

Ethnicities were 90.5% European/Pākehā, 14.2% Māori, 2.2% Pacific peoples, 2.5% Asian, and 1.9% other ethnicities. People may identify with more than one ethnicity.

The percentage of people born overseas was 17.2, compared with 27.1% nationally.

Although some people objected to giving their religion, 55.6% had no religion, 33.4% were Christian, 0.3% were Hindu, 0.1% were Muslim, 0.6% were Buddhist and 2.6% had other religions.

Of those at least 15 years old, 2,070 (23.9%) people had a bachelor or higher degree, and 1,599 (18.5%) people had no formal qualifications. The median income was $32,900, compared with $31,800 nationally. 1,710 people (19.8%) earned over $70,000 compared to 17.2% nationally. The employment status of those at least 15 was that 4,239 (49.0%) people were employed full-time, 1,446 (16.7%) were part-time, and 237 (2.7%) were unemployed.

Transport

Because of South Wairarapa's proximity to the capital city of New Zealand, Wellington, there are close links between the two areas. For example, some people live in South Wairarapa and commute to Wellington each day to work; others live and work in Wellington while spending weekends in South Wairarapa. The Wairarapa Line, part of the Metlink public transport network for the Wellington region, passes through the district (which is served by the two stations of Featherston and Woodside) and provides a faster method of transport into the city than the Remutaka pass road. Metlink buses also provide services to Greytown and Martinborough from the railway stations and Masterton.

Local and regional government
The South Wairarapa District Council is the territorial authority responsible for the area. The council consists of nine councillors; the current mayor is Martin Connelly. The three towns also have their own community boards.

References

External links

 Official website of the South Wairarapa District Council

 
Wairarapa